Eubranchus telesforoi is a species of sea slug or nudibranch, a marine gastropod mollusc in the family Eubranchidae.

Distribution
This species was described from La Tejita, Tenerife, Canary Islands, Spain.

References

Eubranchidae
Gastropods described in 2002